Horace J. "Hoddy" Mahon (January 17, 1932 – November 25, 2011) was born in Scranton, Pennsylvania and was the head coach of the Seton Hall Pirates men's basketball team during the 1981-82 season. He succeeded Bill Raftery and preceded P. J. Carlesimo. He was a longtime assistant coach for the Pirates and was hired to replace Raftery, who left to pursue his communications career. 

Preceding his tenure at Seton Hall, he was a very successful New Jersey high school coach at Orange High School and at Essex Catholic High School. He brought both schools to the state finals. He won the Essex county and state championships while at Orange. Mahon's college coaching career began at Fordham University as an assistant to Hal Whistle, where he helped recruit players Ken Charles and Charlie Yelverton for the Rams. 

After Fordham, he joined Raftery at Seton Hall as an assistant for 12 years. While head coach, he knocked off the University of Houston and Phi Slama Jama in a huge upset and started the season with a 9–1 record.  Then, two starters and one bench player who played large minutes were declared academically ineligible for the Pirates' second half of the season. Despite this, Mahon finished with a respectable season. However, even after doing this, Mahon was not hired by the university at the end of the season. In the end, Seton Hall decided to hire the younger, more energetic P. J. Carlesimo instead of the older, more conservative Mahon. This effectively ended Mahon's tenure at Seton Hall and he later took the reins at both William Paterson University and Upsala College, both of which are New Jersey schools. At both institutions he recorded winning records. His grandson JP Mahon of Red Bank Catholic High School led the Shore Conference in assists during the 2012 - 2013 basketball season.

He died at his Allenhurst, New Jersey home in 2011.

References

1932 births
2011 deaths
High school basketball coaches in the United States
Fordham Rams men's basketball coaches
People from Allenhurst, New Jersey
Saint Peter's University alumni
Seton Hall Pirates men's basketball coaches
Upsala Vikings men's basketball coaches